Netrostoma is a genus of true jellyfish in the family Cepheidae. They are found in the Indo-Pacific. They are sometimes called crown jellyfish, but this can cause confusion with the closely related genus Cephea or the distantly related species in the order Coronatae.

Species
According to the World Register of Marine Species, this genus includes the following species:

 Netrostoma coerulescens
 Netrostoma dumokuroa
 Netrostoma nuda
 Netrostoma setouchianum

References

Cepheidae
Scyphozoan genera